HMS Camperdown was an  of the Royal Navy, named after Adam Duncan, 1st Viscount Duncan of Camperdown.

Design

In comparison to these earlier ships, she had an increased thickness of barbette armour, and a lengthened armour belt.

The  guns were carried in two pairs, in barbettes positioned on the centre-line at either end of the superstructure.

History

Camperdown was commissioned at Portsmouth on 18 July 1889, and initially went into reserve. In December 1889 she was posted to the Mediterranean Fleet as flagship, where she remained until being posted as flagship of the Channel Fleet in May 1890. She was paid off in May 1892 into Fleet reserve, recommissioning in July 1892 into the Mediterranean Fleet. On 22 June 1893, she collided with and sank the battleship  with 358 deaths, including Vice-Admiral Sir George Tryon.

In 1897, Camperdown arrived off Crete to join the International Squadron, a multinational force made up of ships of the Austro-Hungarian Navy, French Navy, Imperial German Navy, Italian Royal Navy (Regia Marina), Imperial Russian Navy, and Royal Navy that intervened in the 1897–1898 insurrection of Cretan Christians against the Ottoman Empire. On 26 and 27 March 1897, she fired her guns in anger for the first time – including four  rounds from her  guns – bombarding Christian insurgents besieging the Ottoman-held Izzeddin Fortress near the entrance to Suda Bay. On 21 April 1897, she anchored off Canea (now Chania) – where Ottoman troops, Cretan Turk civilians, and a force of British and Italian soldiers were besieged by an estimated 60,000 insurgents – to deter insurgents who had begun a demonstration with two artillery pieces that threatened the town. In response to a violent riot by Cretan Turks at Candia (now Heraklion) the previous day, she arrived at Candia on 7 September 1898 to reinforce the occupation forces there and put a contingent of Royal Marines ashore. After the local Ottoman governor refused to meet various British demands during a meeting aboard the British flagship, the battleship , in Candia′s harbor on 13 September, Camperdown and Revenge conducted a demonstration that overcame his reluctance.

In September 1899, Camperdown went into Category B reserve, and in May 1900 into Dockyard reserve. In July 1900 she commissioned as a coast guard ship at Lough Swilly until May 1903. During early Summer (April to June) 1902 she visited Portsmouth for repairs to her steam capstan. She took part in the fleet review held at Spithead on 16 August 1902 for the coronation of King Edward VII. Captain Frederic Edward Errington Brock was temporarily in command for a month from 24 September until 7 November 1902, when Captain Frederick Owen Pike took command. After paying off in 1903, she was in reserve at Chatham until 1908, and was employed at Harwich as a berthing ship for submarines until she was sold in 1911.

References

Notes

Bibliography

 
 Clowes, Sir William Laird. The Royal Navy: A History From the Earliest Times to the Death of Queen Victoria, Volume Seven. London: Chatham Publishing, 1997. .  
 McTiernan, Mick, A Very Bad Place Indeed For a Soldier. The British involvement in the early stages of the European Intervention in Crete. 1897 - 1898, King's College, London, September 2014.
Parkes, Oscar, British Battleships 
maritimequest.com: HMS Camperdown

 

Admiral-class battleships
Victorian-era battleships of the United Kingdom
Ships built in Portsmouth
1885 ships
Maritime incidents in 1893